John Fink (born February 11, 1940) is an American film and television actor.

In the 1970–1971 the NBC sitcom Nancy, Fink was cast as an Iowa veterinarian, Dr. Adam Hudson, who marries the daughter of the President of the United States. The short-lived series starred Renne Jarrett (born 1946) as the title character and Celeste Holm and Robert F. Simon in supporting roles.

He is known for his roles in two Batman movies, Batman Forever (1995) and Batman & Robin (1997), and his other film credits include Loving (1970), The Carey Treatment (1972), Home for the Holidays (1972), The Lindbergh Kidnapping Case (1976), Flatliners (1990), What's Love Got to Do with It (1993) and The Client (1994). He has also had minor roles in Saved by the Bell, Ally McBeal, McMillan & Wife, Columbo, and various other series since the 1970s.

While he was billed as a supporting actor in the 1978 Battlestar Galactica pilot, a majority of his scenes were cut mainly because those scenes dealt with Serina's (Jane Seymour) "space cancer" B-story which had been excised from the final cut.

Filmography

External links
 
 

1940 births
American male film actors
American male television actors
Living people